Hector Mansfield Howell (17 September 1842 – 7 April 1918) was a Canadian lawyer and judge. He was Chief Justice of Manitoba from 1909 to 1918.

References

External links 

 Memorable Manitobans: Hector Mansfield Howell (1842-1918)

1842 births
1918 deaths
Judges in Manitoba
Lawyers in Manitoba
Lawyers in Ontario
Canadian King's Counsel